Colin O'Brien may refer to:
 Colin O'Brien (tennis)
 Colin O'Brien (photographer)
 Colin O'Brien (hurler)